Summit Township may refer to:

Arkansas
 Summit Township, Boone County, Arkansas
 Summit Township, Marion County, Arkansas, in Marion County, Arkansas

Illinois
 Summit Township, Effingham County, Illinois

Iowa
 Summit Township, Adair County, Iowa
 Summit Township, Clay County, Iowa
 Summit Township, Marion County, Iowa, in Marion County, Iowa
 Summit Township, O'Brien County, Iowa

Kansas
 Summit Township, Chautauqua County, Kansas
 Summit Township, Cloud County, Kansas
 Summit Township, Decatur County, Kansas
 Summit Township, Marion County, Kansas

Michigan
 Summit Township, Jackson County, Michigan
 Summit Township, Mason County, Michigan

Minnesota
 Summit Township, Beltrami County, Minnesota
 Summit Township, Steele County, Minnesota

Missouri
 Summit Township, Bates County, Missouri
 Summit Township, Callaway County, Missouri

Nebraska
 Summit Township, Burt County, Nebraska
 Summit Township, Butler County, Nebraska

New Jersey
 Summit Township, Union County, New Jersey, now the city of Summit

North Dakota
 Summit Township, Richland County, North Dakota, in Richland County, North Dakota

Ohio
 Summit Township, Monroe County, Ohio

Pennsylvania
 Summit Township, Butler County, Pennsylvania
 Summit Township, Crawford County, Pennsylvania
 Summit Township, Erie County, Pennsylvania
 Summit Township, Potter County, Pennsylvania
 Summit Township, Somerset County, Pennsylvania

South Dakota
 Summit Township, Lake County, South Dakota, in Lake County, South Dakota
 Summit Township, Roberts County, South Dakota, in Roberts County, South Dakota

See also
 Summit (disambiguation)

Township name disambiguation pages